The Museo Juan Manuel Fangio (Juan Manuel Fangio Museum), is a museum of motor racing cars, dedicated to Formula One driver Juan Manuel Fangio and located in Balcarce, Buenos Aires Province, Argentina.

The museum 
Located just a few blocks from where Fangio was born, the museum houses a collection of cars, trophies, photographs and other memorabilia. The car collection has over 50 cars.

Notable racing cars 
 McLaren Honda MP4/3B
 Brabham BT 36
 Toyota Eagle MK II
 Renault RE 30B
 McLaren MP4/10
 Sauber Mercedes-Benz C9
 Penske PC-23 Mercedes-Benz
 Alfa Romeo 308
 Mercedes-Benz W196
 Maserati 250F
 Lancia-Ferrari D50
 Simca Gordini T15
 Simca-Gordini T15S Compresseur
 Arrows A21
 Maserati 300S
 Lola T96/20

Other notable cars 
 Mercedes-Benz C111
 Mercedes-Benz 300SL
 Mercedes-Benz 300 Coupe

Notable visitors 
  Juan Manuel Fangio
  José Froilán González
  Stirling Moss
  Jackie Stewart
  Clay Regazzoni
  Luigi Villoresi
  Phil Hill
  Carroll Shelby

References

External links 

 Website Fangio Museum

Automotive museums
Museums established in 1986
Museo Juan Manuel Fangio
Juan Manuel Fangio